Sheikhati Union is a union parishad of Narail Sadar Upazila, Narail District in Khulna Division of Bangladesh. It has an area of 23.45 km2 (9.05 sq mi) and a population of 21,927.

References

Unions of Narail Sadar Upazila
Unions of Narail District
Unions of Khulna Division